John Howe (August 30, 1926 – August 18, 2008) was a Canadian director, producer, and composer with the National Film Board of Canada. He is best known for his films Do Not Fold, Staple, Spindle or Mutilate and Why Rock the Boat?, and for his handling of the NFB’s 1969 Austerity Crisis.

Early life
John Thomas Howe was born in Toronto, the son of Thomas and Margret Ogilvy (Manzie) Howe. At age 18, he joined the Royal Regiment of Canadian Artillery, saw action in Europe, and in 1946, left the service with the rank of Captain. Upon his return to Canada, he went to the University of Toronto, graduating in 1950.

Career
While in university, Howe worked as a director's assistant at the Canadian Repertory Theatre, and as a freelance reporter for the CBC. He also appeared in two episodes of two CBC television series: Space Command and Encounter.
In 1955, he was hired by the National Film Board of Canada where he stayed for 28 years, directing, producing, and/or writing 52 films, some in both English and French. He was also a keen composer and wrote the music for some of his productions.

Howe was very active in industry associations. In addition to his memberships with the Alliance of Canadian Cinema, Television and Radio Artists (ACTRA), and the Directors Guild of America, he was past president of the Society of Composers, Authors, and Music Publishers of Canada (SOCAN), past president (board, film division) of the Canada Council for the Arts and past-president of the Syndicat général du cinéma et de la télévision (SGCT). The latter was the union of all NFB production staff and Howe was its president during the Austerity Crisis of 1969.

Austerity Crisis of 1969

In 1969, Prime Minister Pierre Trudeau had taken a “no free lunch” position and stated that he intended to cut the size of the civil service by 10%. At this time, the NFB was known to be over-staffed and producers routinely overspent their budgets by as much as 200%. Some filmmakers were known to be using NFB facilities for their side projects; others were known to be using their positions for political purposes. The NFB was a natural target for cost-cutting and its commissioner, Hugo McPherson, had to find ways to streamline the organization.

McPherson’s solution was to close regional offices, freeze the annual budget, cut half of the films sponsored by government departments, charge people to view NFB films and cut personnel—25% of English staff, 11.5% of French personnel. However, the union had just negotiated a $1.249 million increase in salaries. McPherson’s cuts meant that the increase would be just $260,000.

In August 1969, Howe formed a Crisis Committee. Initially, the committee kept the situation out of the public eye and pressured ministers and officials until the Treasury Board allotted another $1 million for salaries. McPherson was unwilling to come up with the shortfall or change his position on other measures. There was no declared strike, but production came to a halt. As no progress was being made, Howe spoke to the Globe and Mail, accusing the government of union-busting and betraying the national trust. Letters streamed in from Canada and around the world. The public pressure forced McPherson to drop the idea of user fees. The work stoppage meant that there were no expenditures so the NFB had the money to cover the salary shortfall. The union sued to prevent lay-offs; in the end, fewer than 50 personnel members were laid off; most through retirement.

Academia
In 1983, Howe left the NFB to become an associate professor at the Department of Cinema and Television at the University of Southern California, Los Angeles, where he would stay until his retirement in 1996.

Personal life and death
In 1974, Howe married Beverley Jean Luchuck; they had five children, four of whom pre-deceased their parents. Upon retirement, Howe and his wife had settled at the family's summer home in Warner, New Hampshire; he died there, of natural causes, on August 18, 2008.

Filmography
Invasion from the South - documentary short, 1956 - writer and director 
Our Northern Citizen - documentary short, 1956 - writer and director 
North of 60 - documentary short, 1956 - writer and director 
Canada's Air Defence - documentary short, 1957 - writer and director 
Poverty and Plenty - documentary short, 1957 - director
R.C.A.F. Air Defence Command - documentary short, 1957 - writer and director 
The Invisible Keystone - documentary short, 1957 - director 
Black and White in South Africa - documentary short, 1957 - director 
Colonialism: Ogre or Angel? - documentary short, 1957 - director 
The Sceptre and the Mace - documentary short, 1957 - director 
They Called it White Man’s Burden - documentary short, 1957 - director 
The Awakening Mackenzie - documentary short, Hector Lemieux, 1958 - producer
Down North - documentary short, 1958 - lyricist, writer, producer 
Why Canada? - documentary short, Edmund Reid 1958 - producer 
Here and There - The St. Lawrence Seaway, Part 1: Lifeline - documentary short, 1958 - writer, producer, director
Here and There - The St. Lawrence Seaway, Part 2: Power - documentary short, 1958 - producer, director
Here and There - The St. Lawrence Seaway, Part 3: Bottleneck - documentary short, 1958 - producer, director
The St. Lawrence Seaway - documentary short, 1959 - writer, producer, director
The Queen’s Plate - documentary short, 1959 - writer, producer and director 
Summary Trials - training film, 1959 - director 
Canada on Stage - documentary short, 1960 - director 
The Test - short film, 1961 - director 
Vote for Michalski - short film, 1961 - director 
Lord Durham - short film, 1961 - director 
Robert Baldwin: A Matter of Principle - short film, 1961 - director 
Yukon Old, Yukon New - documentary short, 1961 - director 
Mathematics at Your Fingertips - documentary short, 1961 - director 
Georges-Étienne Cartier: The Lion of Québec - short film, 1962 - director 
Gone Curling - documentary short, 1963 - director 
The Head Men - documentary short, 1963 - director 
Wedding Day - documentary short, 1963 - director 
Portrait of the Artist - documentary short, 1964 - director 
David and Hazel: A Story in Communication - short film, 1964 - director
Jamie: The Story of a Sibling - short film, 1964 - director
The Hundredth Summer - documentary, Terence Macartney-Filgate 1964 - producer
Canadians Can Dance - documentary short, 1966 - producer and director 
Ducks, of Course - documentary short, 1966 - director 
The Meeting - short film, Morten Parker 1966 - producer
Long Ways to Go - short film, 1966 - director
The Shattered Silence - short film, Morten Parker 1966 - producer
Where Mrs. Whalley Lives - short film, Graham Parker 1966 - producer
Labour College - documentary short, Mort Ransen 1966 - producer
Do Not Fold, Staple, Spindle or Mutilate - drama, 1967 - editor, director
A Pleasant Duty - documentary, 1971 - director
Why I Sing - documentary, 1972 - director
Star - feature, 1974 - composer, writer, director
A Star is Lost! - feature, 1974 - composer, writer, director
Why Rock the Boat? - feature, 1974 - composer, director
Strangers at the Door - short film, 1977 - producer, director
Teach Me to Dance - short film, Anne Wheeler 1978 - producer
A Choice of Two - drama, 1981 - composer, editor, producer, director 
Excuse Me, But There's a Computer Asking for You - documentary short, 1983 - editor, producer, director

Awards

The Queen’s Plate (1959)
International Sports Film Festival, Cortina d'Ampezzo, Italy: Diploma of Merit, 1961

Mathematics at Your Fingertips (1961)
 15th Canadian Film Awards, Montreal: Genie Award for Best Film, Training and Instruction, 1963
 Columbus International Film & Animation Festival, Columbus, Ohio: Chris Certificate, Information/Education, 1964

The Test (1961) 
 American Film and Video Festival, New York: Blue Ribbon, Ethnical Problems, 1962
 Yorkton Film Festival, Yorkton, Saskatchewan: First Prize, Sociological 1962
 Columbus International Film & Animation Festival, Columbus, Ohio: Chris Certificate, Adult Education, 1969

Yukon Old, Yukon New (1961)
 Columbus International Film & Animation Festival, Columbus, Ohio: Chris Certificate, Commercial Travel 1962

Where Mrs. Whalley Lives (1966)
 Columbus International Film & Animation Festival, Columbus, Ohio: Chris Certificate, Mental Health, 1966

Do Not Fold, Staple, Spindle or Mutilate (1967)
 Canadian Labour International Film Festival, Montreal: Grand Prize, 167 August 15, 1967
 20th Canadian Film Awards, Toronto: Genie Award for Best Film Over 30 Minutes, 1968
 International Labour and Industrial Film, Antwerp: Award of Excellence, 1969
 International Labour and Industrial Film, Antwerp: Diploma of Merit, 1969

Why Rock the Boat? (1974)
 Chicago International Film Festival, Chicago: Bronze Hugo, 1974

Teach Me to Dance (1978)
 Child of our Time Festival, Milan: Diploma of Honour, 1979

References

1926 births
2008 deaths
Film directors from Toronto
Film producers from Ontario
National Film Board of Canada people
University of Toronto alumni
Canadian trade unionists